This is a list of television shows set in Dallas, Texas:



B
 Barney & Friends
 The Benefactor
 Big Rich Texas

D
 Dallas
 Dallas Divas & Daughters
 Deadly Cinema

F
 Fast N' Loud

G
 GCB
 The Good Guys

H
 Halt and Catch Fire

L
 Lonestar

N
 The Naughty Kitchen with Chef Blythe Beck

Q
 Queen of the South

R
 The Real Housewives of Dallas

S
 Sons of Thunder

T
 True Blood (Season 2)

W
 Walker, Texas Ranger

References 

Dallas

Television shows